Marc Mboua (born 26 February 1987) is a Cameroonian former professional footballer who played as a striker.

Career
Mboua, like so many other children, started to learn football on the streets of his home city, Cameroonian capital Yaoundé. In 1999, along with another 300 boys Mboua took part in trials at local club Elpida de Yaoundé. He stayed there, as part of their academy, for two years, before moving to Racing FC Bafoussam, where he spent only one season.

In 2002 Mboua signed for Mali-based AS Real Bamako and began his senior career. In the 2003–04 season Mboua scored 13 times in 26 games, earning him a close-season move to Zamalek in 2004.

In 2006, he followed the path of many African footballers to France, where he joined SC Feignies in the CFA2 division. Here he stayed for only one season before moving to the Netherlands, to join Eerste Divisie side SC Cambuur.

His form for Cambuur, where he scored 11 times in 31 games, earned him a place in the Cameroon squad for the 2008 Olympics in Beijing, where he made two appearances.

Personal life
During his time in Egypt, Mboua met a French woman, Sophie, whom he married. They now have a daughter together, Mélissa. On 18 April 2007, a DJ by the name of "DJ Sergio" released a track entitled "Buldo" – Mboua's nickname, a song that is a tribute to Mboua, his family and concerns the obstacles in his career.

References

External links
 

1987 births
Living people
Cameroonian footballers
Footballers from Yaoundé
Association football midfielders
Cameroon international footballers
Egyptian Premier League players
Championnat National 2 players
Championnat National 3 players
Eerste Divisie players
AS Real Bamako players
Zamalek SC players
Entente Feignies Aulnoye FC players
SC Cambuur players
Fortuna Sittard players
Al Ittihad Alexandria Club players
Smouha SC players
Telephonat Beni Suef SC players
Al-Hilal SC (Benghazi) players
El Entag El Harby SC players
Toulouse Rodéo FC players
FC Aurillac Arpajon Cantal Auvergne players
AS Muret players
Footballers at the 2008 Summer Olympics
Olympic footballers of Cameroon
Cameroonian expatriate footballers
Cameroonian expatriate sportspeople in Egypt
Expatriate footballers in Egypt
Cameroonian expatriate sportspeople in France
Expatriate footballers in France
Cameroonian expatriate sportspeople in the Netherlands
Expatriate footballers in the Netherlands
Cameroonian expatriate sportspeople in Libya
Expatriate footballers in Libya